Tikrasqa (Quechua tikray to turn upside down, -sqa a suffix, "turned upside down", also spelled Tecrasca) is a  mountain in the Bolivian Andes. It is located in the Cochabamba Department, Mizque Province, Vila Vila Municipality.

The Pukara Mayu which downstream is named Wila Wila originates north of the mountain. It flows to the southeast.

References 

Mountains of Cochabamba Department